Wouter Burger (born 16 February 2001) is a Dutch professional footballer who plays as midfielder for Swiss Super League club FC Basel.

Club career

Feyenoord
Burger started playing football at amateur club ZBVH in the village of Zuid-Beijerland near Rotterdam. Via SHO and Excelsior, he joined the Feyenoord youth academy. On 30 March 2017, Burger signed his first professional contract at the age of 16.

Burger made his first-team debut for Feyenoord on 17 August 2018 in the 2018–19 UEFA Europa League third round qualifiers against AS Trenčín, coming on for Tyrell Malacia in the 83rd minute. On 29 August 2019, Burger scored his first goal in professional football in a 3–0 away win against Hapoel Be'er Sheva for Feyenoord in the play-off round of the 2019–20 UEFA Europa League. In December 2018, he signed another contract extension, keeping him at the club until 2023.

Loan to Excelsior
Burger was sent on loan to his former youth club Excelsior in the second half of the 2019–20 season. Due to the COVID-19 pandemic, the loan agreement was cut short. Burger played in all seven league games for Excelsior, before the league was suspended.

Loan to Sparta
Ahead of the 2020–21 season, Burger was sent on another loan to a Rotterdam-based club – this time Sparta. Here he made 18 first team appearances in the Eredivisie scoring two goals.

Basel
On 31 August 2021 Swiss Super League club Basel announced that Burger had signed a four-year contract with them. Burger joined Basel's first team during their 2021–22 season under head coach Patrick Rahmen. He made his domestic league debut for his new club on 12 September being substituted in during the away game as Basel played a 1–1 draw against Lugano. In his first season Burger played 35 domestic league and Conference League matches without scoring a goal. He scored his first goal for his club in the first match of the 2022–23 Swiss Super League season. It was the equaliser in the away game at the Schützenwiese on 16 July 2022 as Basel played a 1–1 draw with Winterthur.

International career
With the Netherlands U17 team, Burger participated in the 2018 UEFA European Under-17 Championship in England. The team eventually won the final over Italy after a penalty-shootout. Burger was subsequently included in the UEFA team of the tournament.

Career statistics

Club

Honours
Feyenoord
 Johan Cruyff Shield: 2018

Netherlands U17
 UEFA European Under-17 Championship: 2018

Individual
 UEFA European Under-17 Championship Team of the Tournament: 2018

References

External links
 Profile season 2021/22 on the Swiss Football League homepage
 Profile at FC Basel 

2001 births
Living people
People from Korendijk
Footballers from South Holland
Dutch footballers
Dutch expatriate footballers
Association football midfielders
Netherlands youth international footballers
Netherlands under-21 international footballers
Feyenoord players
Excelsior Rotterdam players
Sparta Rotterdam players
FC Basel players
Eredivisie players
Eerste Divisie players
Swiss Super League players
Expatriate footballers in Switzerland
Dutch expatriate sportspeople in Switzerland
21st-century Dutch people